The fifth season of the animated television series BoJack Horseman premiered on Netflix on September 14, 2018. The season consists of 12 episodes.

Cast and characters

Main
Will Arnett as BoJack Horseman
Amy Sedaris as Princess Carolyn
Alison Brie as Diane Nguyen
Paul F. Tompkins as Mr. Peanutbutter
Aaron Paul as Todd Chavez

Recurring
Rami Malek as Flip McVicker
Stephanie Beatriz as Gina Cazador
Hong Chau as Pickles Aplenty

Guest
Ed Helms as Kyle
Natalie Morales as Yolanda Buenaventura
Issa Rae as Dr. Indira, Diane's therapist
Laura Linney as herself
Wanda Sykes as Mary Beth, Dr. Indira's wife and a corporate mediator
Eva Longoria as Yolanda's mother
John Leguizamo as Yolanda's father
Bobby Cannavale as Vance Waggoner
Angela Bassett as Ana Spanakopita
Jaime Pressly as Sadie
David Sedaris as Cutie Cutie Cupcake, Princess Carolyn's mother
Jessica Biel as herself
Aparna Nancherla as Hollyhock Manheim-Mannheim-Guerrero-Robinson-Zilberschlag-Hsung-Fonzerelli-McQuack
Ken Jeong as Dr. Allen Hu
Raúl Esparza as Ralph Stilton
Brian Tyree Henry as Cooper Thomas Rogers Wallace, Jr.
Daveed Diggs as Cooper Thomas Rogers Wallace, Sr.
Margo Martindale as Esteemed Character Actress Margo Martindale
Whoopi Goldberg as Mikhaela
James Adomian as Stuart, Princess Carolyn's assistant
Abbi Jacobson as Emily
Daniele Gaither as Biscuits Braxby

Episodes

Reception

Critical response
On the review aggregator Rotten Tomatoes, the series has an approval rating of 98% based on 42 reviews, with an average score of 9.33. The site's consensus reads "BoJack Horseman continues confidently down the thematic rabbit hole with a fresh and poignant season that's as devastating as it is hilarious". On Metacritic, which uses a weighted average, the season holds a score of 92, indicating "universal acclaim".

For Vox, Emily VanDerWerff gave the season a score of 4.5 out of 5, praising the show's "truly sustained artistic response to the #MeToo movement". Ben Travers of IndieWire, who writes that the "series seems infallible", notes the season's effort to look inward and address controversy, even its own.

References

External links 
  – official site
 BoJack Horseman at Netflix
 

2018 American television seasons
BoJack Horseman seasons